Albany Municipal Airport  is a city-owned public-use airport located one nautical mile (1.85 km) north of the central business district of Albany, a city in Gentry County, Missouri, United States.

Facilities and aircraft 
It has one runway designated 1/19 with a concrete surface measuring 3,300 by 50 feet (1,006 x 15 m).

For the 12-month period ending May 31, 2009, the airport had 3,280 aircraft operations, an average of 273 per month: 99.7% general aviation and 0.3% military.
At that time there were 8 aircraft based at this airport: 87.5% single-engine and 12.5% multi-engine.

References

External links 
  at Missouri DOT airport directory
 Aerial image as of 24 February 1996 from USGS The National Map
 

Airports in Missouri
Buildings and structures in Gentry County, Missouri